Tawang is one of the 60 assembly constituencies of  Arunachal Pradesh a north east state of India. It is part of Arunachal West Lok Sabha constituency.

Members of Legislative Assembly
 1990: Thupten Tempa, Bhartiya janta party
 1995: Thupten Tempa, Bhartiya janta party
 1999: Thupten Tempa, Bhartiya janta party
 2004: Tsewang Dhondup, Bhartiya janta party
 2009: Tsewang Dhondup, Bhartiya janta party
 2014: Tsering Tashi, Bhartiya janta party

Election results

2019

See also

 Tawang
 Tawang district
 List of constituencies of Arunachal Pradesh Legislative Assembly

References

Assembly constituencies of Arunachal Pradesh
Tawang district